Senra incana is a flowering plant species in the genus Senra. The plant produces the phenolic compounds coniferaldehyde, scopoletin, sinapaldehyde and syringaldehyde

References

External links

 Senra incana on JStor

Hibisceae
Plants described in 1786
Taxa named by Antonio José Cavanilles